Camitia rotellina, common name the wheel top shell, is a species of sea snail, a marine gastropod mollusk in the family Trochidae, the top snails.

Description
The length of the shell varies between 10 mm and 20 mm. The discoidal, depressed, smooth, shining shell is covered-perforate. The six whorls, are, under a lens, very minutely, obliquely striate. The earliest whorls are whitish, spirally obsoletely sulcate, the remainder are pale flesh-colored, ornamented with a subsutural linear zone and oblique brown spots. The body whorl is dilated, obtuse in the middle, spirally trilineate (one line above, two at periphery), somewhat convex beneath, with two zones of brown spots. The aperture is transverse, and scarcely sulcate within. The columella is nearly horizontal, twisted above, truncate beneath. The columellar callus forms a coating to the extremely oblique umbilicus.

Distribution
This marine species occurs off Taiwan, off the Ryukyu Islands, in the East China Sea and off the Philippines.

References

 Hedley, C., 1908. Studies on Australian Mollusca. Part X. Proc. Linn. Soc. N.S.W, 33:456-489.
 Habe, T., 1964. Shells of the Western Pacific in color II. Hoikusha, Osaka. 66 pls, 233
 Higo, S., Callomon, P. & Goto, Y., 1999. Catalogue and bibliography of the Marine shell-bearing Mollusca of Japan. Elle Scientific Publications, Japan. 749

External links
 To Encyclopedia of Life
 To World Register of Marine Species
 

rotellina
Gastropods described in 1849